Hofmeisterella is a genus of orchids native to South America. Two species are known:

Hofmeisterella eumicroscopica  (Rchb.f.) Rchb.f. in W.G. Walpers (1852) - Venezuela, Colombia, Ecuador, Peru, Bolivia
Hofmeisterella falcata (Linden & Rchb.f.) Nauray & A.Galán (2009) - Colombia

The genus was named by Heinrich Gustav Reichenbach for W. Hoffmeister, a German botany professor. This miniature, epiphytic orchid occurs in cool to cold habitats in mountainous rain forests at heights between 1600 and 2400 m. This is a stemless plant with fleshy, terete leaves. The axillary inflorescence is erect to arcuate. It gives rise to few to several, successively flowering, relatively large, yellow flowers with a purple shine at their base.

References 

Oncidiinae
Oncidiinae genera
Epiphytic orchids
Orchids of South America